One Story is a literary magazine which publishes 12 issues a year, each issue containing a single short story.  The magazine was founded in 2002 by writers Hannah Tinti and Maribeth Batcha.

References

2002 establishments in New York City
Literary magazines published in the United States
Fiction magazines
Magazines established in 2002
Magazines published in New York City